Agrawal (anglicised as Agarwal, Agerwal, Agrawala, Agarwala, Agarwalla, Aggarwal, Agarawal, Agarawala) is a Bania Vaishya community, found throughout northern, central and western India, mainly in the states of Rajasthan, Haryana, Punjab, Chandigarh, Himachal Pradesh, Uttarakhand, Delhi, Chhattisgarh, Gujarat and Uttar Pradesh. Members of the Agrawal community were also found in what are now the Pakistani provinces of Punjab and Sindh, though at the time of the partition of India, most of them migrated across the newly created border to independent India. The majority religions followed by the Agrawals include Vaishnava Hinduism and Jainism.

Members of the Agrawal community are known for their business acumen and have for many years been influential and prosperous in India. Even in modern-day tech and ecommerce companies, they continue to dominate. It was reported in 2013, that for every 100 in funding for e-commerce companies in India, 40 went to firms founded by Agrawals.

History
Agrawals are a part of the larger Bania community.

Migration to Rajput kingdoms
During the era of Islamic administrative rule in India, some Agrawal, as with the Saraogi, migrated to the Bikaner State. The Malkana include Muslim Agrawals, who converted from Hinduism to Islam during this time and were given land tracts along the Yamuna by Afghan rulers.

In the early 15th century, Agrawals flourished as a Halwai trader community, under the Tomaras of Gwalior. According to several Sanskrit inscription at the Gwalior Fort in Gwalior District, several traders (Sanghavi Kamala Simha, Khela Brahmachari, Sandhadhip Namadas etc.) belonging to Agrotavansha (Agrawal clan) supported the sculptures and carving of idols at the place.
Historian K.C. Jain comments:

Migration to Eastern India

Later, during the Mughal rule, and during the British East India Company administration, some Agrawals migrated to Bihar and Calcutta, who became the major component of the Marwaris.

Gotras 

Agrawals belong to various gotras, traditionally said to be seventeen and a half in number. According to Bharatendu Harishchandra's Agarwalon ki Utpatti (1871), Agrasen - the legendary progenitor of the community - performed 17 sacrifices and left the eighteenth incomplete, resulting in this number. Bharatendu also mentions that Agrasen had 17 queens and a junior queen, but does not mention any connection between the number of gotras and the number of queens, or describe how the sacrifices led to the formation of the gotras. Another popular legend claims that a boy and girl from the Goyan gotra married each other by mistake, which led to the formation of a new "half" gotra.

Historically, there has been no unanimity regarding number and names of these seventeen and a half gotras, and there are regional differences between the list of gotras. The Akhil Bhartiya Agrawal Sammelan, a major organization of Agrawals, has created a standardized list of gotras, which was adopted as an official list by a vote at the organization's 1983 convention. Because the classification of any particular gotra as "half" is considered insulting, the Sammelan provides a list of following 18 gotras:

The existence of all the gotras mentioned in the list is controversial, and the list does not include several existing clans such as Kotrivala, Pasari, Mudgal, Tibreval, and Singhla.

Notable Agrawals

See also 
 Agrawal Jain
 List of Agrawals

References

Bibliography

External links

 
Bania communities
Indian surnames
Social groups of Rajasthan
Social groups of Haryana
Social groups of Delhi
Social groups of Uttar Pradesh
Social groups of Punjab, India
Social groups of Himachal Pradesh
Social groups of Uttarakhand
Hindu surnames
People from Hisar district
Surnames of Hindustani origin
Surnames of Indian origin